Kane Fraser (born 22 July 1977) is a former Australian rules footballer who played with Hawthorn in the Australian Football League (AFL).

Hawthorn selected Fraser with pick 51 of the 1995 National Draft, from TAC Cup side Eastern Ranges. He was originally from  East Ringwood. A half back flanker, he made just five senior appearances for Hawthorn, over three seasons.

References

External links
 
 

1977 births
Living people
Australian rules footballers from Victoria (Australia)
Hawthorn Football Club players
Eastern Ranges players